CoEur is a Christian devotional and hiking route in Italy and Switzerland.  Its Italian subtitle, Nel cuore dei cammini d'Europa, translates as "In the heart of Europe's paths".

History of the route
The path CoEUR was created in the late 1990s, when information about Saint Charles Borromeo's trips in the northern Piedmont was discovered, leading to the initiation of the Path of Saint Charles (Cammino di San Carlo) between Arona, the town where the Archbishop was born, and Viverone, the town where the Via Francigena passes through the province of Biella.

This track has been used as a starting point for the CoEUR path, which links all the devotional places along Lake Maggiore up to Locarno. In its ideal prosecution, the path reaches Einsiedeln abbey connecting the Via Francigena with the Camino de Santiago in its Swiss section, named Via Jacobi.

This combination of paths creates a connection between two sanctuaries consecrated to the black Madonna: Oropa and Einsiedeln.

Sectors of the route

Path of Saint Charles 
This path follows routes made by Saint Charles Borromeo during his many pilgrimages through Lake Maggiore, Lake Orta, the Sesia valley, the Biellese territory and Canavese.

Twelve stages connect Arona with the Via Francigena in Viverone, passing by three Sacri Monti and many sanctuaries of the Verbano, Cusio and Biellese territories.

Via delle Genti 
This route starts in Arona, runs along Lake Maggiore as far as Brissago, Locarno, and Bellinzona, and continues towards the Gotthard Pass, that connects the southern Swiss cantons (Valais and Ticino) with the central cantons of (Uri and Graubünden).

Via Spiritualità 
This path connects Domodossola and Baceno with the Swiss town Ernen along ancient mule tracks.

From Domodossola the way goes along the Toce river through the Antigorio valley, as far as the Arbola Pass, connecting Italy and Valais, and afterwards ends up in Ernen.

From Domodossola the way continues towards Verbania and the main path of CoEUR passing through Ornavasso, with its cycle paths.

Via del Mercato 
This historic way starts in Domodossola and goes through the Valle Vigezzo and the Centovalli as far as Locarno. The track uses trails and mule tracks of the ancient Via del Mercato, the way on which merchants from Italy and Switzerland transported goods. In the early 20th century the Centovalli railway was built in order to develop commerce and nowadays it is a major tourist attraction.

This path includes the Santuario della Madonna del Sangue in Re, a destination of many pilgrimages from the neighbourhood, halfway between the Ossola valley and Lake Maggiore.

The ring of Saint Charles 
In the Cannobio valley there is a network of paths connecting the numerous villages in the valley associated with Charles Borromeo's visits to the Pieve of Cannobio.

The witches of Croveo 
The area between Baceno and Croveo is historically connected with witchcraft trials, attested by many plaques explaining legends, popular beliefs and historic proof of the many witchcraft trials that occurred in this area in past centuries.

The UNESCO sites 
The CoEUR path connects nine UNESCO World Heritage Sites.

Two in Switzerland:
 Monte San Giorgio
 Three Castles of Bellinzona

Seven in Italy:
 Five out of nine Sacri Monti of Piedmont and Lombardy:
 Sacro Monte di Oropa
 Sacro Monte di Varallo
 Sacro Monte di Orta
 Sacro Monte di Ghiffa
 Sacro Monte di Domodossola
 Two Prehistoric pile dwellings around the Alps:
 VI.1-Emissario by the Viverone Lake
 Mercurago by Arona

Natural reserves 
Along the way there are many nature parks and natural reserves.
 National park of the Locarnese territory (CH) - Waiting for law approval
 Forest reserve of Palagnedra (CH)
 Forest reserve of the Sacred wood of Mergugno (CH)
 Bolle di Magadino Natural Reserve (CH)
 Val Grande National Park
 Alpe Veglia and Alpe Devero Natural Park
 Alta Valle Antrona Natural Park
 Fondo Toce Natural Reserve
 Lagoni di Mercurago Natural Park
 Monte Fenera Natural Park
 Parco Burcina Natural Reserve
 Bessa Natural Reserve
 Sacro Monte di Varallo Natural Reserve
 Sacro Monte di Orta Natural Reserve
 Sacro Monte di Oropa Natural Reserve
 Protected area of the Oasi Zegna
 SCI of the Valsessera

See also 
 Camino de Santiago
 Via Francigena
 UNESCO

References

External links 
  official site

Hiking trails in Italy
Hiking trails in Switzerland